Knocking on Death's Door is a 1999 American-Irish horror film.

Plot
In a New England village, two newlywed students of the paranormal enter Hillside House to document the activities of a legion of ghosts. They uncover a murderous history that leads them into the clutches of a mysterious doctor.

Cast
David Carradine as Doc Hadley
Kimberly Rowe as Danielle Gallagher
Brian Bloom as Brad Gallagher
John Doe as Professor Ballard

Production
The film was shot for Concorde Anois at Roger Corman's studios near Galway.

References

External links
Knocking on Death's Door at IMDb
Review at Mondo digital
Knocking on Death's Door at BFI

1999 films
English-language Irish films
1990s English-language films
Films directed by Mitch Marcus